The Ranelagh International Cup was an amateur international team golf championship for women contested annually at the Ranelagh Club in west London, between 1901 and 1936. Generally it was played between the four Home Nations of England, Ireland, Scotland and Wales, where Ireland were represented by the whole island of Ireland on an All-Ireland basis.

The Ranelagh Club had hosted a ladies' open meeting from the mid-1890s. In 1901 an international competition was added, played concurrently with a number of other events, including a club competition. The event was held over two days. Teams of up to eight played a stroke-play round each day. The team score was determined by the leading four scores each day. Initially England, Ireland and Scotland competed with Wales first playing in 1909. Before World War I the contests were generally quite close but after the war England dominated, often winning by large margins. Scotland failed to raise a team in 1936 and later in the year the Ladies Golf Union cancelled the international event.

Results

Winning scores
The following table lists the individual scores for the winning team. Only those scores that contributed to the team score are included, the best four rounds and ties. For 1932, the first day scores for the England team are listed. England were leading by 20 strokes after the first day.

References

Amateur golf tournaments
Team golf tournaments
Women's golf tournaments
Golf tournaments in England
Recurring sporting events established in 1901
Recurring sporting events disestablished in 1936
1901 establishments in England
1936 disestablishments in England